Aída Cuevas (born Aída Gabriela Cuevas Castillo; September 24, 1963) is a Mexican singer and actress.

Life

Aída Cuevas began singing in amateur contests at the age of 11 and was quickly discovered because of her exceptional talent. Her first national exposure was singing in a weekly live radio program called "El Taller XEW" in 1975 at the age of 12 years. A year later she was performing on stages across Europe. These performances quickly led her to be known as "La Voz de México" (The Voice of Mexico) at an early age. Her talent has led her to perform across 4 continents since 1976.

Affectionately known as "The Queen of Ranchera Music”, Cuevas has recorded 40 albums, selling 10 million copies worldwide. Cuevas' work has earned her one Grammy Award and one Latin Grammy Award.

Cuevas' well-known songs are "El Pastor", "La Cigarra", "Te Doy Las Gracias", "Te Vas a Quedar Con Las Ganas", "Quizás Mañana", "Traición a Juan", "Me Equivoque Contigo", and "No Me Amenaces".

Discography

Movies
 (1981) Te Solté la Rienda
 (1983) No Vale Nada la Vida
 (1989) La Gallera
 (1989) Pero Sigo Siendo el Rey
 (1990) El Tigre del Norte

Awards

References

External links

Official website

1963 births
Living people
Grammy Award winners
Mariachi musicians
Ranchera singers
Latin Grammy Award winners
20th-century Mexican women singers
21st-century Mexican women singers
Mexican child actresses
Mexican film actresses
Mexican stage actresses
Mexican voice actresses
Mexican telenovela actresses
Mexican television presenters
Singers from Mexico City
Actresses from Mexico City
Portuguese-language singers of Mexico
Mexican people of Spanish descent
Mexican women television presenters
Women in Latin music